The Caribou River is a river in the Unorganized Part of Rainy River District in Northwestern Ontario, Canada. The river is part of the Hudson Bay drainage basin. It runs from Wilson Lake to Upper Seine Bay on Marmion Lake. Marmion Lake flows via the Seine River, the Rainy River, the Winnipeg River and the Nelson River to Hudson Bay.

Tributaries
Bar Creek (right)

References

Sources

Rivers of Rainy River District